The Helaletidae is an extinct family of tapiroid closely related and likely ancestral to the true tapirs, which contain Protapirus and all descendants. In alternative classifications, the Helaletidae is treated as a subfamily within Tapiridae, the Helaletinae.

Members of the family are defined by having less bilophodont cheek teeth compared to other tapiroids.

References

Prehistoric mammal families
Odd-toed ungulates